Arrawelo or Arraweelo ' was a proto-Somali Queen in traditional folklore.

Biography
Arawelo is said to have been based in lands inhabited by the Habr Je'lo clan, specifically a place called Murihi in the Sanaag region. Ralph E. Drake-Brockman was one of the first Western researchers to publish an account of Arawelo, in his 1912 book British Somaliland he states:The story says that thousands of years ago there lived in what is now the tract of country occupied by the Habr Toljaala tribe, a great Somali queen called Arawailo, who was greatly feared by her people owing to her eccentricities. Arawailo lived at a place called Murihi, so the story goes, for little save a huge mound of stones, under which she is said to lie buried, now marks the capital of her ancient kingdom. Towards the end of her life Arawailo began to show marked favour towards her own sex and great animosity towards her male subjects.Semi-biographical tales which give many personal details of this queen are given. For instance, Arawelo's mother was said to have been called Haramaanyo; but no mention is made in the tales about who her father was. She was the first born of three daughters and natural heir to the dynasty. Like many female rulers, Arawelo fought for female empowerment; she believed society should be based on a matriarchy. There is no solid evidence of her existence other than testimony.

Location
Drake-Brockman reports that the location of her Kingdom was centred around a location called Murihi in then British Somaliland, today part of Sanaag region. Her throne was passed down to an unknown next of kin.

Defying Gender Roles
She came to power around AD 15. During her reign, Arawelo's husband objected to her self-ascribed role as the breadwinner to all of society, as he thought women should be restrict themselves to merely domestic duties about the house and leave everything else to men. In response, Arawelo demanded that all women across the land abandon their womanly role in society.

Arawelo thought this role reversal was necessary since she saw women as natural peacekeepers. Growing up she believed that women were not treated well and the men were more often instigators, participants and conductors of war and politics. She not only fought for the liberation of women in feudal society but for the dominance of women as she saw them as better and more efficient leaders.

In Popular Culture
References to Carawelo in Somali culture today include nicknaming a girl/woman who is very assertive and dominant "Caraweelo". She is also, by one source, claimed to have been the Harla queen of the ancient Somali people, but this does not conform with the fact that she is just commonly interpreted as a folkloric figure. Opinions on her legacy vary widely, with critics denouncing her for her androcidal nature and introducing the practise of infibulation, a type of FGM, while supporters eulogize her gynocentric attempts at female empowerment.

Farah M. Mohamed published a book about her in 2014.

Arawelo is featured in Rejected Princesses

See also
Furra, a similar queen of the Sidama people
Gudit, a warrior queen of the Kingdom of Aksum

References

African women in war
Matriarchy
Mythological queens
People whose existence is disputed
Somalian military leaders